R. P. Ulaganambi (10 June 1938 – 7 January 2020) was an Indian lawyer and politician from Tamil Nadu. He was a member of the Lok Sabha.

Biography
Ulaganambi was born on 10 June 1938 in Ranipet. He studied in Don Bosco High School, Pachaiyappa's College, Presidency College and Madras Law College. He was elected as a member of the Lok Sabha as a Dravida Munnetra Kazhagam candidate from  Vellore in 1971. Later, he quit the party and joined Indian National Congress after a disagreement with the party high command.

Ulaganambi died on 7 January 2020 at the age of 81.

References

1938 births
2020 deaths
Dravida Munnetra Kazhagam politicians
Indian National Congress politicians from Tamil Nadu
India MPs 1971–1977
Lok Sabha members from Tamil Nadu
Indian lawyers
Presidency College, Chennai alumni